was a town located in Ōnuma District, Fukushima Prefecture, Japan.

As of 2003, the town had an estimated population of 6,500 and a population density of 161.85 persons per km². The total area was 40.16 km².

On October 1, 2005, Aizuhongō, along with the town of Aizutakada, and the village of Niitsuru (all from Ōnuma District), was merged to create the town of Aizumisato.

External links
Aizumisato official website 

Dissolved municipalities of Fukushima Prefecture
Aizumisato, Fukushima